Marc William Hynes (born 26 February 1978 in Guildford) is a British racing driver, who competed for Quantel Bifold Racing. with Triple Eight Race Engineering in the British Touring Car Championship.

He won the 1995 British Formula Vauxhall Junior title and the 1997 British Formula Renault title.

He then stepped up to Formula 3 and won the 1999 British Formula 3 Championship for Manor Motorsport beating Luciano Burti and Jenson Button into second and third places respectively. He competed in three rounds of the 2000 International Formula 3000 season for the WRT team. He has also tested for the Formula One team British American Racing.

He has also worked as a driver coach for his former team Manor Motorsport. He is also the former Head of Driver Development at Marussia F1, the Formula One team born out of Manor Motorsport.

From 2016 to 2021, Hynes worked with Lewis Hamilton, helping run Project 44, the company which manages Hamilton's business affairs. Hynes and Hamilton became friends during their junior racing careers and parted amicably to allow Hynes to focus on other business activities.

Racing record

Complete International Formula 3000 results
(key) (Races in bold indicate pole position; races in italics indicate fastest lap.)

Complete Porsche Supercup results
(key) (Races in bold indicate pole position) (Races in italics indicate fastest lap)

Complete British Touring Car Championship results
(key) Races in bold indicate pole position (1 point awarded – just in first race) Races in italics indicate fastest lap (1 point awarded) * signifies that driver lead race for at least one lap (1 point awarded)

* Season still in progress.

References

1978 births
Living people
British Formula Renault 2.0 drivers
British Formula Three Championship drivers
English racing drivers
International Formula 3000 drivers
European Le Mans Series drivers
Porsche Supercup drivers
Formula One people
British Touring Car Championship drivers
Manor Motorsport drivers
Kolles Racing drivers
German Formula Three Championship drivers
OAK Racing drivers